Nogometni Klub Stol Virtus, commonly referred to as NK Stol Virtus or simply Stol, was a Slovenian football club from Kamnik. The club was formed as SK Virtus in 1930 in the industrial Kamnik settlement, Duplica. After the war it was renamed to NK Svoboda Duplica and competed in lower rangs until 1965, when it ceased to exist for a decade. Due to the financial collapse of city rivals NK Kamnik and sponsorship of strong furniture company Stol, the club managed to take the primacy in Kamnik football. They were renamed to NK Stol and came all the way to Slovenian first league in 1981. The club was later renamed to NK Stol Virtus, but withdrew from competitions in 1991.

References

Association football clubs established in 1975
Football clubs in Yugoslavia
1975 establishments in Slovenia
Defunct football clubs in Slovenia